Live at Blues Alley is a double live album by the Wynton Marsalis Quartet, recorded at Blues Alley in December 1986 and released through Columbia Records in 1987. The quartet included trumpeter Wynton Marsalis, bassist Robert Hurst, pianist Marcus Roberts and drummer Jeff "Tain" Watts. The album was produced by Steven Epstein; George Butler served as executive producer.

In 1988, the album reached a peak position of number two on Billboard Top Jazz Albums chart.

Composition
The double live album Live at Blues Alley by the Wynton Marsalis Quartet was recorded December 19–20, 1986 at Blues Alley in Georgetown, Washington, D.C. Members of the quartet included trumpeter Wynton Marsalis, double bassist Robert Hurst, pianist Marcus Roberts and drummer Jeff "Tain" Watts. The album was produced by Steven Epstein; George Butler served as executive producer.

Marsalis's compositions on the album include "Knozz-Moe-King", "Skain's Domain", "Delfeayo's Dilemma", and "Much Later". Stanley Crouch wrote the album's liner notes.

Critical reception

AllMusic's Scott Yanow recommended the album, awarding it 4.5 of 5 stars.

Track listing

Adapted from AllMusic.

Personnel

Musicians
 Wynton Marsalis – trumpet
 Marcus Roberts – piano
 Robert Hurst – double bass
 Jeff "Tain" Watts – drums

Production
 Steven Epstein – producer
 George Butler – executive producer
 Tim Geelan – engineer, mixing
 Phil Gitomer – assistant engineer
 J.B. Matteotti – assistant engineer
 Delfeayo Marsalis – mixing
 Stanley Crouch – liner notes

Charts
In 1988, Live at Blues Alley reached a peak position of number two on Billboard Top Jazz Albums chart.

See also

 List of 1930s jazz standards
 List of post-1950 jazz standards
 Wynton Marsalis discography

References

1987 live albums
Albums produced by George Butler (record producer)
Columbia Records live albums
Wynton Marsalis albums